Waxahachie is the seat of government of Ellis County, Texas, United States. Its population was 41,140 in 2020.

Etymology

Some sources state that the name means "cow" or "buffalo" in an unspecified  Native American language. One possible Native American origin is the Alabama language, originally spoken in the area of Alabama around Waxahatchee Creek by the Alabama-Coushatta people, who had migrated by the 1850s to eastern Texas. In the Alabama language, waakasi hachi means "calf's tail" (the Alabama word waaka being a loan from Spanish vaca).

That there is a Waxahatchee Creek near present-day Shelby, Alabama, suggests that Waxahachie shares the same name etymology. Many place names in Texas and Oklahoma have their origins in the Southeastern United States, largely due to forced removal of various southeastern Indian tribes. The area in central Alabama that includes Waxahatchee Creek was for hundreds of years the home of the Upper Creek moiety of the Muscogee Creek Nation. Again, this would suggest a Muscogee Creek-language origin of Waxahachie. "Waxahachie", therefore, may be an anglicized pronunciation of the Muscogee compound word wakvhvce from the Muscogee words wakv (meaning "cow" derived from the Spanish vaca) and the Muscogee word hvcce (meaning "river" or "creek").

History

Waxahachie was founded in August 1850 as the seat of the newly established Ellis County on a  tract of land donated by early settler Emory W. Rogers, a native of Lawrence County, Alabama, who migrated to Texas in 1839. It was incorporated on April 28, 1871, and in 1875, the state legislature granted investors the right to operate a rail line from Waxahachie Tap Railroad to Garrett, Texas, which greatly increased the population of Waxahachie.

From 1902 to 1942, Waxahachie was the second home of Trinity University, which was a Presbyterian-affiliated institution founded in 1869. Then-Trinity's main administration and classroom building is today the Farmer Administration Building of Southwestern Assemblies of God University.  Trinity's present-day location is San Antonio.

The town is the namesake of the former United States Naval Ship Waxahachie (YTB-814).

In 2020, County Judge Todd Little came into the national spotlight when the county's only elected African-American, Constable Curtis Polk, Jr., protested having his office located in the basement of the courthouse next to a segregation-era sign that read "Negroes." The controversy was resolved amicably when Little worked with Polk to relocate him to another office.

Geography

Climate
The climate in this area is characterized by hot, humid summers and generally mild to cool winters.  According to the Köppen climate classification, Waxahachie has a humid subtropical climate, Cfa on climate maps.

Demographics

As of the 2020 United States census, there were 41,140 people, 12,522 households, and 9,073 families residing in the city.

Economy
Employment opportunities in the city are highly oriented toward industry. Owens Corning, Georgia-Pacific, International Paper, James Hardie Industries, Berry Global, Americase, Cardinal Glass, Magnablend, and Dart Container are located within a few miles of each other. Nonindustrial employers include Baylor Scott & White Health, Waxahachie Independent School District, Walgreen Distribution Center, Wal-Mart, HEB Grocery, Navarro College, and Southwestern Assemblies of God University.

Arts and culture

Annual cultural events
The Scarborough Renaissance Festival (also called Scarborough Faire), a Renaissance fair theme park, is located southwest of the town. It opens annually during April and May, and has been in operation since 1981. The city's annual Gingerbread Trail Festival features tours of many of the Gingerbread homes.

Bethlehem Revisited, a reenactment of the birth of Jesus, occurs behind Central Presbyterian Church in early December.

The Texas Country Reporter Festival (hosted by Bob Phillips) features artists, craftsmen, music, and food from all over the Lone Star State – much of it featured on the TV show over the years.

Tourism
Waxahachie is locally known for its elaborate Richardsonian Romanesque courthouse. The town also features many examples of Victorian architecture and Gingerbread-style homes, several of which have been converted into bed and breakfast inns. The Ellis County Art Association hosts ART On The Square (Cultural Attractions- Events- & Facilities; 113 West Franklin Street).

Parks and recreation
Parks in Waxahachie include Spring Park, Getzendaner Memorial Park, Richards Park, Chapman Park, and Brown-Singleton Park.

Government
The city of Waxahachie is a voluntary member of the North Central Texas Council of Governments association, the purpose of which is to coordinate individual and collective local governments and facilitate regional solutions, eliminate unnecessary duplication, and enable joint decisions.

State government
Waxahachie is represented in the Texas Senate by Republican Brian Birdwell, District 22,  and in the Texas House of Representatives by Republican Brian Harrison, District 10.

The Texas Department of Criminal Justice (TDCJ) operates the Waxahachie District Parole Office in Sherman.

Federal government
At the federal level, the two U.S. senators from Texas are Republicans John Cornyn and Ted Cruz; since 2003, Waxahachie has been part of Texas's 6th congressional district, which is currently represented by Republican Jake Ellzey.

The United States Postal Service operates the Waxahachie Post Office.

Education

Primary and secondary

Waxahachie is served by the Waxahachie Independent School District (WISD), which currently has eight elementary campuses, three middle school campuses, and two high schools. WISD aims to offer all of its students a well-rounded education and offers advanced-placement and dual-credit courses, as well as varied career and technology courses.

Waxahachie High School, classified as 6A, offers a range of extracurricular activities to its students, including football, volleyball, men's and women's basketball, men's and women's soccer, baseball, softball, golf, tennis, concert and marching band, drama, choir, drill team, and dozens of academic teams and clubs. The football program made the playoffs every year from 1989 to 2010.Waxahachie Global High School, an ECHS T-STEM school emphasizing instruction in science, technology, engineering, and mathematics in a small-learning-community environment, opened on August 27, 2007.

In addition to the district schools, Life School, a public charter-school system, operates a 7–12 grade campus. On April 15, 2014, Life School broke ground on a new high school in Waxahachie, planned to accommodate about 1,000 9th–12th graders.

Private schools

There are several private schools including Waxahachie Preparatory Academy (WPA), St. Joseph Catholic School, and First Christian Day School. WPA and First Christian Day School offer a kindergarten–grade 12 education, while St. Joseph offers grades Pre-K–8.

Colleges and universities

Two postsecondary educational institutions have campuses in the city of Waxahachie: Navarro College, a community college based in Corsicana, Texas, and Southwestern Assemblies of God University (SAGU), a private, four-year university affiliated with the Assemblies of God, which offers accredited undergraduate and graduate degrees.

Media

The first newspaper in Waxahachie, the now-defunct Waxahachie Argus, was established in 1870. The Waxahachie Daily Light has served the town since 1891.  Additionally, there are 47 radio stations within close listening range of Waxahachie. KBEC radio has served the community and surrounding area since 1955.

Photo Gallery

Infrastructure

Health care
Both Altus Emergency Center and Baylor Scott & White Health at Waxahachie provide emergency services locally, as does Ennis Regional Medical Center, about 14 miles away in Ennis. Between 2003 and 2010, Waxahachie's healthcare industry added 555 jobs, making it the city's fourth-largest employment sector.

Transportation
  Interstate 35E is a major north-south freeway serving as a bypass around the west side of Waxahachie. The freeway connects with Red Oak, Desoto/Lancaster, and Dallas to the north; Italy, Hillsboro, and Waco to the south.
  U.S. Route 287, also a freeway, runs in a northwest-southeast direction through the north side of the city. The freeway connects with Midlothian, Mansfield, and Fort Worth to the west and Ennis to the east.
  U.S. Route 77, a north-south highway, serves as the main thoroughfare through the city, passing through downtown and the north side of the city. The highway parallels Interstate 35 and reconnects with the interstate just outside the city limits. Many of the city's commercial developments line Highway 77.

Notable people

 Robert Benton, won an Oscar for Best Original Screenplay for Places in the Heart, which was filmed in Waxahachie  
 Jammal Brown, professional football player   
 Tevin Campbell, Grammy-nominated R&B singer   
 Emanuel Cleaver, U.S. Representative   
 Bessie Coleman, first female African-American pilot (born in Atlanta, Texas; moved to Waxahachie at age 2)   
 Elizabeth Otis Dannelly, poet   
 Frederic Forrest, Oscar-nominated actor  
 Robert J. Groden, JFK assassination expert, released the Zapruder film on national TV on March 6, 1975 
 Josie Briggs Hall, author of A Scroll of Facts and Advice (Houx’s Printery, 1905), the first book published by a black woman Texan   
 Bill Ham, manager for ZZ Top 
 Dale Hansen, sports anchor WFAA-TV Channel 8 Dallas, Texas  
 Desmond Mason, professional basketball player   
 Julie Miller, songwriter, singer, and recording artist   
 Dick Murdoch, professional wrestler   
 Byron Nelson, professional golfer   
 Jim Pitts, former member of the Texas House of Representatives  
 Paul Richards, Major League Baseball player, manager and executive   
 Broderick Sargent, professional football player  
 Brian Waters, professional football player  
 John Wray, former member of the Texas House of Representatives and former mayor of Waxahachie
 Aldrick Robinson, professional football player and coach
 Jalen Reagor, professional footbal player

In popular culture
In the mid-1980s, Waxahachie became a filming location for the movie industry.

The majority of Tender Mercies, a 1983 film about a country western singer, was filmed in Waxahachie. Director Bruce Beresford deliberately avoided the city's picturesque elements and Victorian architecture, and instead filmed more rural locations that more closely resembled the West Texas area. The Texas town portrayed in Tender Mercies is never specifically identified.  Tender Mercies starred Robert Duvall, who won the 1983 Academy Award for Best Actor for his role in the film.

The 1984 film Places in the Heart starring Sally Field was also filmed in Waxahachie. Unlike Tender Mercies, it was filmed deliberately in the town square and used the Victorian and plantation homes still intact in the area. Field won the Academy Award for Best Actress in 1985 for her role in the film.

The 1985 film The Trip to Bountiful starring Geraldine Page was also filmed in Waxahachie. Page won the Academy Award for Best Actress in 1986 for her role in Bountiful.

Other movies made in or around Waxahachie are:

 1918, directed by Ken Harrison, tells of the severe influenza outbreak after soldiers returned from World War I. Local talent in the film includes L.T. Felty, a former high-school principal and local actor, who was cast as the mayor.
 On Valentine's Day, also directed by Ken Harrison, is the central film in Horton Foote's semiautobiographical trilogy that also includes Courtship and 1918. It is a nearly verbatim retelling of his stage play and the sets and costumes.
 Missionary Man stars Dolph Lundgren and was filmed in downtown Waxahachie around the Rogers Hotel.
 The Curse of Inferno, starring Pauly Shore and Janine Turner

Additionally, the long-running television series Walker, Texas Ranger, starring Chuck Norris, was filmed in Waxahachie on occasion. Some scenes in Prison Break were filmed in Waxahachie. Scenes from Bonnie and Clyde (1967) were also shot here.

In 2018, an animated short film from Crypt TV titled Dark Vessel featured the town as its 1977-based setting.

In 2021, Miranda Lambert, Jon Randall and Jack Ingram released a song named for the city on their acoustic album The Marfa Tapes. It was later recorded again with full production for inclusion on Lambert's solo album Palomino in 2022.

Sister cities
Sabinas in Coahuila, Mexico, has been proposed as Waxahachie's sister city.

References

External links

 City of Waxahachie official website
 City-data.com
 Texas State Historical Association

 
Cities in Texas
Cities in Ellis County, Texas
County seats in Texas
Dallas–Fort Worth metroplex